Piazza Duomo is a city square in Padua, Italy.

Buildings around the square
Padua Cathedral
Diocesan museum of Padua, Italy
:it:Battistero di Padova
:it:Museo diocesano di Padova
:it:Palazzo del Monte di Pietà Nuovo

Piazzas in Padua